"Each and Every One" is the second single by the British music duo Everything but the Girl, that reached #28 in the UK charts in May 1984. It was the only single from the album Eden and the USA album Everything but the Girl.

Track listing
 7" Single
 "Each and Every One" (Ben Watt and Tracey Thorn) – 2:45
 "Laugh You Out the House" (Thorn) – 1:45

 12" Single
 "Each and Every One" – 2:45
 "Laugh You Out the House" – 1:45
 "Never Could Have Been Worse" (Watt) – 2:39

Personnel
Tracey Thorn – vocals
Ben Watt – guitar, piano, arrangements, vocals
Chucho Merchán – bass
Charles Hayward – drums
Bosco De Oliveira – percussion
Dick Pearce – flugelhorn
Nigel Nash – tenor saxophone
Pete King – alto saxophone

Technical
Mike Pela – engineering
Simon Halfon – cover design

Charts

Weekly charts

Year-end charts

References

External links
Morrissey, George Michael and Tony Blackburn discuss "Each and Every One" on Pop Jury in 1984

1984 singles
Everything but the Girl songs
Blanco y Negro Records singles
Songs written by Tracey Thorn
Songs written by Ben Watt
1984 songs